Henning Fritz (born 21 September 1974) is a German retired handball goalkeeper, current entrepreneur, book author and TV expert. In 2004, he was the first goalkeeper to be named World Player of the Year.

Sports career 
At , Fritz is a relatively short goalkeeper who began playing major-league handball with SC Magdeburg. He moved to THW Kiel in 2001 and was a member of the Men's German National Handball team from 2002. The German team took second place in the European championships in Sweden that year and another second place in the world championships 2003 in Portugal. In 2004, he participated in the team's success in Slovenia, where it won the European Championships. In 2004 in Athens, he played with the team to another second place.

The opening game of the 2007 Men's Handball World Cup was his 200th game on the national team. He played a great championship, became Most Valuable Player in several games and was nominated for the All Star Team.

Fritz is currently the goalkeeping coach of the German national team.

Career

TV expert 
Since the 2015/16 season, Fritz has been a co-commentator for the television station Sky Deutschland, reporting on EHF Champions League and Handball Bundesliga matches.

Motivation coach 
In addition to his commentary work, he gives lectures and seminars on the subject of regeneration in sport and management. He also writes columns on handball and shares his expertise with readers.

Entrepreneur 
Following his active career, he revealed in 2005 that he had to fight with the burn-out syndrome, which almost forced him to end his career. With a frequency-modulated music application he found  his old strength. From the experience gained from this, he and his partners developed regeneration systems based on frequency-modulated acoustics. In 2018, he and a partner founded the company Neuronavi, which is dedicated to the topic of regeneration and reduction of permanent stress.

Books 
 Frank Gunter, Henning Fritz, Daniel Strigel, Powern und Pausieren, March 2020, Verlag: Edition Essentials,  
 Henning Fritz, Halten und Siegen: Technik, Taktik und Training für Handball-Torhüter und ihre Trainer,January 2009, Philippka-Verlag, EAN /

Personal life 
Fritz is married, has two children and lives in Kraichgau.

References

External links
  
 THW Kiel home page about Henning Fritz 

1974 births
Living people
German male handball players
Olympic handball players of Germany
Handball players at the 2000 Summer Olympics
Handball players at the 2004 Summer Olympics
Handball players at the 2008 Summer Olympics
Olympic silver medalists for Germany
Sportspeople from Magdeburg
Rhein-Neckar Löwen players
SC Magdeburg players
Olympic medalists in handball
Medalists at the 2004 Summer Olympics